Sletta is a village in Østre Toten Municipality in Innlandet county, Norway.

References

Østre Toten
Villages in Innlandet